Budak is a village in Croatia. It is located near Stankovci, connected by the D27 highway.

References

Populated places in Zadar County